Joseph or Joe Garner may refer to:

 Joe Garner (born 1988), English footballer
 Joseph Garner, Baron Garner (1908–1983), British diplomat
 Joe Garner (businessman) (born 1969), chief executive of Nationwide Building Society
 Joe Garner (author), American author and radio executive

See also
 Joel Garner (born 1952), West Indian cricketer